No. 34 Squadron RAF was a squadron of the Royal Air Force. During the First World War it operated as a reconnaissance and bomber squadron and in the 1930s operated light bombers. It was re-equipped with fighter-bombers in the later half of the Second World War and in the post-war period was reformed four times; first as a photo-reconnaissance unit, then anti-aircraft co-operation, then as a jet fighter squadron through the 1950s. It was last active in the 1960s, as a Blackburn Beverley transport squadron.

First World War
No. 34 Squadron RFC was formed at Castle Bromwich on 7 January 1916 from elements of No. 19 Squadron RFC. It went to France in July 1916 as a reconnaissance unit equipped with BE.2s It got RE.8s in January 1917. It transferred to the Italian front flying reconnaissance and bomber missions until the end of the war, returning to the UK and disbanding on 25 September 1919.

1935–45

34 Squadron was re-formed at Bircham Newton on 3 December 1935, out of personnel from No. 18 Squadron RAF. Initially it flew Hawker Hinds before receiving Bristol Blenheims in July 1938 and was stationed at Singapore when the Second World War broke out.

The squadron first saw action in December 1941, against Japanese forces in Malaya. After two months, it had been withdrawn to Sumatra and Java and losses had been so severe that it was officially disbanded. The remaining personnel, aircraft and equipment were withdrawn to India.

It was officially re-formed at RAF Chakrata on 1 April 1942 and re-equipped with Blenheims.  In July and August, some of its aircraft were used to attack rebels in North West Frontier Province. From September until April 1943, the squadron carried out bombing raids against Japanese targets in Burma.

The squadron converted to the light ground attack role from November 1943, when it began to receive single-seat Hawker Hurricane fighter-bombers. These were replaced by Republic Thunderbolts in March 1945. 34 Squadron was disbanded on 15 October 1945.

Post-war
On 1 August 1946 No. 681 Squadron RAF was renumbered as No. 34 Squadron, flying photo-reconnaissance Supermarine Spitfires until disbanding on 31 July 1947. No. 695 Squadron RAF was then renumbered to No. 34 Squadron on 11 February 1949 at Horsham St. Faith, near Norwich. They operated in anti-aircraft co-operation using Bristol Beaufighters and Spitfires until it too disbanded on 24 June 1952.

No. 34 was reformed at Tangmere with Gloster Meteor jets as a fighter squadron in August 1954. In October 1955 Hawker Hunters replaced the Meteors until disbandment on 10 January 1958. No. 34 was then reformed yet again on 1 October 1960 at RAF Seletar, Singapore, in the transport role with Blackburn Beverleys. In December 1962, four Blackburn Beverleys were used to insert Gurkhas into Brunei to combat a revolt by the North Kalimantan National Army (TNKU) against the Sultan of Brunei. The Squadron lasted until the end of 1967 when it was disbanded again.

See also
 List of Royal Air Force aircraft squadrons

References

Bibliography

External links

 Royal Air Force History: History of No. 34 Squadron
 Air of Authority

034
Military units and formations established in 1916
034 squadron
1916 establishments in the United Kingdom